Cassipourea hiotou is a species of plant in the Rhizophoraceae family found in Ivory Coast and Ghana. The species grows naturally in the well-shaded, to wet evergreen forests on the land region lying between the Cavally and Sassandra rivers. Although the extent of these forests has been significantly reduced (due to the expansion of industrial plantations, mining interests and over-logging), it can be locally common.

References

hiotou
Vulnerable plants
Taxonomy articles created by Polbot
Taxa named by François Pellegrin
Taxa named by André Aubréville